is a historic Zen Buddhist temple in Kyoto, Japan, and head temple of its associated branch of Rinzai Buddhism. It is considered to be one of the so-called Kyoto Gozan or "five most important Zen temples of Kyoto".

History

Kennin-ji was founded in 1202 CE and claims to be the oldest Zen temple in Kyoto.

The monk Eisai, credited with introducing Zen to Japan, served as Kennin-ji's founding abbot and is buried on the temple grounds. For its first years the temple combined Zen, Tendai, and Shingon practices, but it became a purely Zen institution under the eleventh abbot,  (1213–1278).

The Zen master Dōgen, later founder of the Japanese Sōtō sect, trained at Kennin-ji. It is one of the Rinzai sect's headquarter temples.

Kennin-ji school
Kennin-ji is the main temple of the Kennin-ji branch, one of the 14 divisions of the Rinzai sect. The branch is regarded to have 72 temples throughout Japan, and approximately 25,000 adherents.

Architecture

When first built, the temple contained seven principal buildings. After suffering from fires through the centuries, it was rebuilt in the mid-thirteenth century by Zen master Enni. In the 13th century, it was damaged by fighting during the Onin War as well as several unrelated fire incidents, precipitating its reconstruction during the 16th century with donations of buildings from nearby temples Ankoku-ji and Tōfuku-ji. Due to further damage and destruction in the succeeding centuries (including the Haibutsu kishaku movement during the Meiji era), many of its structures were also rebuilt during the Edo period and the Meiji, Taisho and Showa eras, such as the Kuri (rebuilt in 1814), the Reito-in (rebuilt in 1853) and the Kaisan-dō (rebuilt in 1884).

Today Kennin-ji's buildings include the Abbot's Quarters (Hōjō), given by Ankoku-ji in 1599; the Dharma Hall (Hatto), built in 1765; a tea house built in 1587 to designs by tea master Sen no Rikyū for Toyotomi Hideyoshi; and the Imperial Messenger Gate (Chokushimon), said to date from the Kamakura period, and still showing marks from arrows. It also has 14 subtemples on the Kennin-ji precincts and about 70 associated temples throughout Japan.

In 2002, the architectural setting was enhanced by a dramatic ceiling painting of two dragons by Koizumi Junsaku (1924–2012). The piece was first painted in the sport hall of a former Elementary school. This bold artwork was installed to commemorate the temple's 800th anniversary. The dragon symbolises the rain of Buddhist teachings. The Shōkoku-ji in Kyoto also features a dragon on the ceiling of its main hall.

Artworks

Kennin-ji contains notable paintings by Tamura Sōryū and Hashimoto Kansetsu. Fujin and Raijin, a pair of two-fold screens by Tawaraya Sōtatsu, are currently on display at the Kyoto National Museum. On the left is Raijin (雷神), a god of lightning, thunder, and storms in the Shinto religion and in Japanese mythology. On the right is Fūjin (風神) or Futen, the Japanese god of the wind and one of the eldest Shinto gods. He is portrayed as a terrifying wizard-like demon, resembling a red headed green-skinned humanoid wearing a leopard skin, carrying a large bag of winds on his shoulders.

According to the Kennin-ji website, "Twin Dragons" by Koizumi Junsaku "commemorates the 800-year anniversary of Kenninji's founding, and a ceremony to mark its installation was given in April 2002. It measures 11.4m by 15.7m (the size of 108 tatami mats) and is drawn with the finest quality ink on thick traditional Japanese paper. It was created in the gymnasium of an elementary school in Hokkaido and took the artist just under two years to complete."

See also
 Yasaka Pagoda
 List of Buddhist temples in Kyoto
 List of National Treasures of Japan (paintings)
 For an explanation of terms concerning Japanese Buddhism, Japanese Buddhist art, and Japanese Buddhist temple architecture, see the Glossary of Japanese Buddhism.

Notes

References
 Dumoulin, Heinrich. (2005).  Zen Buddhism: A History (Vol. II: Japan). Bloomington, Indiana: World Wisdom. 
 Kennin-ji: The Oldest Zen Temple in Kyoto, undated brochure from temple
 Ponsonby-Fane, Richard Arthur Brabazon. (1956). Kyoto: The Old Capital of Japan, 794-1869. Kyoto: The Ponsonby Memorial Society.

External links 

 Kennin-ji official web site;   
  Kyoto Prefectural Tourism Guide:  Kennin-ji
  Joint Council for Japanese Rinzai and Obaku Zen:  Kennin-ji
 Buddhist Travel:  Kennin-ji
 The Buddhist Channel, "Kenninji key to Japan's tea culture

1200s establishments in Japan
1202 establishments in Asia
Buddhist temples in Kyoto
Important Cultural Properties of Japan
Religious organizations established in the 13th century
Kennin-ji temples
 
13th-century Buddhist temples